The Women's 1500 metre freestyle competition of the 2018 European Aquatics Championships was held on 6 and 7 August 2018.

Records
Before the competition, the existing world and championship records were as follows.

Results

Heats
The heats were started on 6 August at 10:48.

Final
The final was started on 7 August at 16:30.

References

Women's 1500 metre freestyle